Fehoko is a surname. Notable people with the surname include:

 Breiden Fehoko (born 1996), American football defensive end
 Simi Fehoko (born 1997), American football wide receiver